The 1979 Cleveland Browns season was the team's 30th season with the National Football League.

Season summary 

In a season which could be titled "The Birth of The Kardiac Kids" the Browns, who finished 9–7, nearly made the playoffs while involved in a number of close games. They won their first three contests, all by three points, over the New York Jets in overtime 25–22, Kansas City Chiefs 27–24 and Baltimore Colts 13–10. They lost to the Washington Redskins by four points, 13–9, midway through the season, then beat the Cincinnati Bengals by one, 28–27, the following Sunday and the Philadelphia Eagles by five, 24–19, two weeks later. The Browns proceeded to lose to the Seattle Seahawks by five points, 29–24, beat the Miami Dolphins by six, 30–24, in overtime and lose to the Pittsburgh Steelers by three, 33–30, again in OT. That was the last of the Browns three overtime games that season. Then came a virtual "blowout" – a seven-point victory over the Houston Oilers, 14–7 – followed by two "one-sided" losses, by five points to the Oakland Raiders, 19–14, and by four to the Bengals, 16–12, to end the year. Add it all up, and 12 of the Browns' 16 games were decided by seven points or less. The club went just 7–5 in those games, though, which was the difference in that season from 1980, when the Browns were 10–2 in 12 contests decided by seven points or less.

How tight was the 1979 season overall for the Browns? So much so that they outscored their foes by just seven points all year.
The Browns moved to 4–0 – their fastest start since 1963 – by stunning heavily favored Dallas 26–7 on Monday Night Football.
The Browns gave up 51 points at home to the Steelers, who would go on to win their second straight Super Bowl and fourth in six years, yet scored 35 on the vaunted Steel Curtain defense and lost by 16. The game was shown on national TV, but NBC cut away to another contest, leaving only the Pittsburgh and Cleveland markets watching, after the Steelers vaulted to a 27–0 lead.

RB Mike Pruitt rushed for 1,294 yards and nine TDs, while wideout Dave Logan led the team in catches with 59 and missed getting 1,000 receiving yards by just 18. Logan, TE Ozzie Newsome and veteran WR Reggie Rucker combined for 22 TD catches.

Offseason

NFL Draft 
The following were selected in the 1979 NFL Draft.

Regular season

Schedule 

Note: Intra-division opponents are in bold text.

Standings

Staff / Coaches

Roster

Awards and records 
 Brian Sipe, NFL Leader, Touchdown Passes (28), Tied with another player

References

External links 
 1979 Cleveland Browns at Pro Football Reference
 1979 Cleveland Browns Statistics at jt-sw.com
 1979 Cleveland Browns Schedule at jt-sw.com
 1979 Cleveland Browns at DatabaseFootball.com  
 

Cleveland
Cleveland Browns seasons
1979 in sports in Ohio